Stearns Road is a major county road in the Chicago Metropolitan Area in parts of DuPage and Kane counties, Illinois, United States. Stearns Road begins at Kane County Highway 34 (Randall Road) in South Elgin and continues east into Greenbrook Boulevard and ends at U.S. Route 20 in Hanover Park. Parts of Stearns Road are signed as Illinois Route 25, DuPage County Route 29, and Kane County Route 37.

History
Stearns Road began at Dunham Road until the bridge corridor was opened to traffic on December 15, 2010. This award-winning project includes  of new road alignment that extends from approximately the Kane–DuPage county line to Randall Road, along with a new Fox River Bridge crossing.

Major intersections

References 

County roads in DuPage County, Illinois
Streets in Chicago
Transportation in DuPage County, Illinois
Transportation in Kane County, Illinois